Trincomalee British War Cemetery (also known as Trincomalee War Cemetery) is a British military cemetery in Trincomalee, Sri Lanka, for soldiers of the British Empire who were killed or died during World War II. The cemetery also has graves of Dutch, French, Italian and other allied forces. It is one of the six Commonwealth war cemeteries in Sri Lanka, and maintained by Sri Lankan Ministry of Defense on behalf of the Commonwealth War Graves Commission.

Here is the list of some headstones:

See also 
 British Garrison Cemetery
 Kandy War Cemetery
 Liveramentu Cemetery

References

External links
 

Buildings and structures in Trincomalee
Commonwealth War Graves Commission cemeteries in Sri Lanka
Tourist attractions in Eastern Province, Sri Lanka
Cemeteries in Sri Lanka